Sphaerodactylus leonardovaldesi is a species of lizard in the family Sphaerodactylidae . The species is endemic to the island of Roatán in Honduras.

Etymology
The specific name, leonardovaldesi, is in honor of Honduran biologist Leonardo Valdés Orellana.

Description

References

Further reading
McCranie JR (2018). "The Lizards, Crocodiles, and Turtles of Honduras. Systematics, Distribution, and Conservation". Bulletin of the Museum of Comparative Zoology 15 (1): 1-129. 
McCranie JR, Hedges SB (2012). "Two new species of geckos from Honduras and resurrection of Sphaerodactylus continentalis Werner from the synonymy of Sphaerodactylus millipunctatus Hallowell (Reptilia, Squamata, Gekkonoidea, Sphaerodactylidae)". Zootaxa 3492: 65-76. (Sphaerodactylus leonardovaldesi, new species, pp. 66-70, Figures 1-3).

Sphaerodactylus
Reptiles of Honduras
Endemic fauna of Honduras
Reptiles described in 2012